A general election was held in the U.S. state of Wyoming on Tuesday, November 6, 1990. All of the state's executive officers—the Governor, Secretary of State, Auditor, Treasurer, and Superintendent of Public Instruction—were up for election. Democrats Mike Sullivan and Kathy Karpan were re-elected as Governor and Secretary of State by landslide margins, while Democrat Lynn Simons was defeated for re-election by Republican Diana Ohman. Republicans also continued their winning streak in the elections for State Auditor and State Treasurer.

Governor

Incumbent Democratic Governor Mike Sullivan ran for re-election to a second term. He faced Republican nominee Mary Mead, the daughter of former Governor Clifford Hansen, in the general election. Sullivan proved popular, despite being a Democrat in a conservative state, and he defeated Mead in a landslide.

Secretary of State
Incumbent Democratic Secretary of State Kathy Karpan ran for re-election to a second term. Unopposed in the Democratic primary, she faced Sweetwater County County Attorney Tom Zollinger in the general election. Aided in part by Governor Sullivan's landslide re-election, Karpan defeated Zollinger by a large margin.

Democratic primary

Candidates
 Kathy Karpan, incumbent Secretary of State

Results

Republican primary

Candidates
 Tom Zollinger, Sweetwater County County Attorney

Results

General election

Results

Auditor
After considering a bid for Governor or running for re-election, incumbent Republican State Auditor Jack Sidi declined to run for re-election. He endorsed his Deputy State Auditor, Tom Jones, who ran to succeed Sidi in the Republican primary. Jones faced former Deputy State Auditor Dave Ferrari in the primary, and ended up narrowly losing the nomination to him. No Democratic candidates initially filed to run for Auditor, but Charles Carroll announced, prior to the primary election, that he would run as a write-in candidate for Auditor. Carroll was the Democratic nominee for Secretary of State in 1974 and then served as a Deputy Attorney General in the 1970s. After winning 522 votes as a write-in candidate in the Democratic primary, Carroll received the nomination.

Democratic primary
No Democratic candidate filed to run for State Auditor, but former Deputy Attorney General Charles Carroll received enough votes as a write-in candidate to receive the nomination, which he accepted.

Republican primary

Candidates
 Dave Ferrari, former Deputy State Auditor
 Tom Jones, Deputy State Auditor

Results

General election

Results

Treasurer
Incumbent Republican State Treasurer Stan Smith ran for re-election to a third term. He won the Republican nomination unopposed and faced Democratic nominee Ron Redo, a former employee in the State Auditor's office, in the general election. Smith, drawing on his strong electoral record from previous campaigns, easily defeated Redo to win his third term in office.

Democratic primary

Candidates
 Ron Redo, former auditor in the Wyoming Workers' Compensation Division

Results

Republican primary

Candidates
 Stan Smith, incumbent State Treasurer

Results

General election

Results

Superintendent of Public Instruction
Incumbent Democratic Superintendent of Public Instruction Lynn Simons ran for re-election to a fourth term. She faced a strong challenge in the Democratic primary from former teacher Beth Evans, who attacked Simons for delegating too many of the office's responsibilities to others in her office, including her longtime Deputy Superintendent, Audrey Cotherman, and for "abandon[ing]" the Department of Education's "basic mission of making Wyoming schools better" in favor of "merely counting numbers and issuing press relations gimmicks." Simons only narrowly defeated Evans in the Democratic primary and advanced to the general election, where she faced elementary school principal Diana Ohman, the Republican nominee.

In the general election, Ohman attacked Simon for the poor relationships that her office fostered with teachers, state legislators, and Department of Education employees and argued that Wyoming's highly ranked schools were "not because of" Simons. Simons, meanwhile, argued that Ohman would be a "political puppet whose strings are pulled by a few ultraconservatives" and for routinely missing work during her employment as a principal. Ultimately, Ohman defeated Simons by a decisive margin, winning 58% of the vote to Simons's 42%.

Democratic primary

Candidates
 Lynn Simons, incumbent Superintendent of Public Instruction
 Beth Evans, education consultant, former Cheyenne public school teacher

Results

Republican primary

Candidates
 Diana Ohman, former elementary school principal
 Ann Tollefson, Casper teacher
 Don Erickson, former Mayor of Cheyenne
 Alan Stauffer, State Representative from Lincoln County

Results

General election

Results

References

 
Wyoming